David Coromina Pararols (born 9 September 1974) is a Spanish former footballer. Mainly a right back, he could also operate as a centre back or left back. He made 57 appearances in La Liga over one and a half seasons with Racing Santander, and one with Deportivo Alavés.

Career

Coromina was born in Santa Pau, in the province of Girona and the autonomous community of Catalonia, and began his career in the youth department of Catalan giants Barcelona. He joined Tercera División side Olot for 1991–92, suffering relegation in his first season. He debuted for Barcelona C in 1993, and played a key role as they won promotion from the Tercera División in 1994–95. They were immediately relegated again the following year, but Coromina impressed enough to be given a chance with Barcelona B during the 1996–97 Segunda División campaign. After yet another relegation, he joined Segunda División B club Gimnàstic de Tarragona in the summer of 1997.

Coromina spent just one season with Nàstic before joining Palamós, also of the third tier, ahead of the 1998–99 season. After three seasons, Palamós finally returned to Segunda B after winning their Tercera División group in 2001–02. Palamós had been purchased in 1999 by Ukrainian-American businessman Dmitry Piterman, with whom Coromina's career would be linked from then on. Piterman bought a 24% stake in La Liga side Racing Santander in January 2003, and immediately signed Coromina for his new acquisition.

Coromina made his top flight debut on 2nd February, as Santander visited Estadio José Zorrilla, where they were beaten 2–1 by Real Valladolid. Piterman's next investment was purchasing 51% of Deportivo Alavés in July 2004, and Coromina was again one of his first signings, joining the same month. Coromina left Santander after 30 La Liga appearances in a season and a half.

Coromina helped Alavés return to the top flight in his first season with the club, and made 27 appearances in 2005–06 as they were immediately relegated again. During a turbulent 2006–07 campaign, in which Alavés employed no fewer than six managers, he played 20 matches. He spent one further season with Alavés, before retiring in 2008, shortly before his 34th birthday.

Honours
Palamós
Tercera División: 2001–02

Career statistics

1. Appearances in the 2003 UEFA Intertoto Cup

References

External links
 
 
 

1974 births
Association football defenders
Deportivo Alavés players
Divisiones Regionales de Fútbol players
FC Barcelona Atlètic players
FC Barcelona C players
Footballers from Catalonia
Gimnàstic de Tarragona footballers
La Liga players
Living people
Palamós CF footballers
People from Garrotxa
Sportspeople from the Province of Girona
Racing de Santander players
Segunda División B players
Segunda División players
Spanish footballers
Tercera División players
UE Olot players